Megachile croceipennis is a species of bee in the family Megachilidae. It was described by Friese in 1917.

References

Croceipennis
Insects described in 1917